Alex Burke (born 11 November 1977 in Glasgow) is a Scottish former professional footballer who played as a midfielder. Burke, who started his career with Kilmarnock, also played with Falkirk, Clydebank, Berwick Rangers, Queen of the South, Ross County, St Mirren, Dunfermline Athletic, and Ayr United, as well as short loan spells with Clydebank and Dunfermline Athletic.

Career
Burke started his playing career at Kilmarnock under then manager Alex Totten. After a loan spell at Clydebank in 2000, Burke signed for First Division side Falkirk, again playing under Alex Totten. After just one season, Burke signed for Clydebank, whom he had been on loan at the year before.

Over the next four years, Burke had successful spells at Berwick Rangers, Queen of the South and Ross County, before signing for Paisley side St Mirren in 2006.

In February 2008, Burke moved on loan to First Division side Dunfermline Athletic until the end of the season. After only playing four matches for the Pars, Jim McIntyre confirmed that Burke had signed a two-year-deal with the club.

After his released from Dunfermline, he joined Ayr United following a successful trial period. Burke made just three league appearances, six in total, before being let go by the South Ayrshire club in January 2012.

References

External links

Living people
1977 births
Footballers from Glasgow
Scottish footballers
Scottish Premier League players
Scottish Football League players
Kilmarnock F.C. players
Clydebank F.C. (1965) players
Falkirk F.C. players
Berwick Rangers F.C. players
Queen of the South F.C. players
Ross County F.C. players
St Mirren F.C. players
Dunfermline Athletic F.C. players
Ayr United F.C. players
Scotland under-21 international footballers
Association football midfielders